A list of films produced in Argentina in 1949:

External links and references
 Argentine films of 1949 at the Internet Movie Database

1949
Films
Argentine